John Geldersma (born October 16, 1942, in New Orleans, Louisiana) is known for his wooden sculptures of, what he calls, "contemporary tribalism".

Life
Geldersma earned a BFA from the University of Louisiana at Lafayette (then known as University of Southwestern Louisiana) and a MFA from Rutgers, the State University of New Jersey. The artist has cited his early immersion in the intersection of such divergent cultures as French, Spanish, African-American, Caribbean, Anglo-Saxon and Native American as a major influence on his art. Geldersma divides his time between his native Louisiana and Colorado.

Works
Geldersma began carving totems and masks in 1970, inspired by African art.

His Spirit Poles are carved, smooth, minimalist, vertical, wooden poles with tapered ends, usually three or more feet long, some on bases. Geldersma works with aspen, pecan, weathered driftwood, and salvaged wood to create totemic poles, cairns, and tablets. Gelderma has said he makes the pieces with eyes at eye level to give viewers a sense of "confrontation and connection".

The artist's creative process involves studying the wood and its twists and turns. The original shape of the wood often dictates how the totem will ultimately look. Beginning with the raw material, Geldersma first removes the bark with a knife and then works the piece of wood with a chainsaw to get the rough shape. Using increasingly smaller tools, from grinders to sandpaper and steel wool, Geldersma works the wood into his desired form. He then applies color either by painting the totems in bands of colors or by burning them to achieve blacks.

Solo exhibitions 
 2013 Variations, Chiaroscuro Contemporary Art, Santa Fe
 2011 Black Wings, Chiaroscuro Contemporary Art, Santa Fe
 2009 Presence of Spirit, Acadiana Center for the Arts, Lafayette, Louisiana
 2007 Zeitgeist Gallery, Nashville, Tennessee
 2006 Arthur Roger Gallery, New Orleans, Louisiana
 2005 LewAllen Contemporary, Santa Fe, New Mexico
 2005 S.O.F.A, courtesy of Jean Albano Gallery, Chicago, Illinois
 2004 LewAllen Contemporary, Santa Fe, New Mexico
 Marguerite Oestriecher Fine Art, New Orleans, Louisiana
 2003 LewAllen Contemporary, Santa Fe, New Mexico
 2002 Marguerite Oestriecher Fine Art, New Orleans, Louisiana
 2001 LewAllen Contemporary, Santa Fe, New Mexico
 2000  Marguerite Oestricher Fine Arts, New Orleans, Louisiana
 1999 LewAllen Contemporary, Santa Fe, New Mexico
 1998 Marguerite Oesteicher Fine Art, New Orleans, Louisiana
 1998 Jean Albano Gallery, Chicago, Illinois
 1997 Retrospective Exhibition, Masur Museum of Art, Monroe, Louisiana
 1996 Hotel díVille, Surrenne, France
 1996 R. Treger Gallerie, Paris, France
 1996 Cline LewAllen Contemporary, Santa Fe, New Mexico
 1995 Butters Gallery Ltd., Portland, Oregon
 1994 Captured Spirits: John Geldersma Sculpture 1964–1994,
 1994 University of Southwestern Louisiana, Lafayette, Louisiana
 1993 Gasperi Gallery, New Orleans, Louisiana
 1992 Mill Street Gallery, Aspen, Colorado
 1991 Willougby Sharp Gallery, New York, New York
 1991 Artworks Gallery, Seattle, Washington
 1990 LewAllen/Butler Fine Arts, Santa Fe, New Mexico
 1989 Duplantier Gallery, New Orleans, Louisiana
 1989 LewAllen/Butler Fine Arts, Santa Fe, New Mexico
 1988 Primitivist Sculpture: John Geldersma, Art Museum of Southeast Texas, Beaumont, Texas
 1987 Via Serpents, University Art Museum, Lafayette, Louisiana
 1977 Memphis Art Academy, Memphis, Tennessee
 1967 Rutgers, The State University, New Brunswick, New Jersey
 1965 Fine Arts Gallery, The University of Southwestern, Louisiana, Lafayette, Louisiana

Selected group exhibitions 
 2012 Totems & Talismans, ENO Gallery, †Hillsboro, North Carolina
 2011 NEWMEXORADO, Harwood Museum of Art, Taos, New Mexico
 2010 Introducing . . . Three New Gallery Artists, Chiaroscuro Contemporary Art, Santa Fe, New Mexico
 Materials Matter, Chiaroscuro Contemporary Art, Santa Fe, New Mexico
 2001 Artists of S.O.F.A., Jean Albano Gallery, Chicago, Illinois
 2000 Under the Influence: Artists Respond to the Twentieth Century, Contemporary Arts Center, New Orleans, Louisiana
 Palates and Pate: A Joining of Creative and Culinary Arts, Acadiana Outreach Center, Lafayette, Louisiana
 Levy Gallery, Monroe, Louisiana
 Petite Physique: A Body of Small Work, Marcia Wood Gallery, Atlanta, Georgia
 Art Heart, Sophia Georg Gallery, Denver, Colorado
 Five From Louisiana, Center for Fine and Performing Arts, Pensacola, Florida
 School House Show, Fort Collins, Colorado
 1999 Winter Group Exhibition, J. Cotter Gallery, Beaver Creek, Colorado
 S.O.F.A., courtesy Jean Albano Gallery, Chicago, Illinois
 Levy Gallery, Monroe, Louisiana
 LewAllen Contemporary, Santa Fe, New Mexico
 1998 S.O.F.A., courtesy of Jean Albano Gallery, Chicago, Illinois
 McLaren Markowitz Gallery, Boulder, Colorado
 J. Cotter Gallery, Beaver Creek, Colorado
 1997 Southern Stars, Art Center Galleries, Contemporary Masterworks from
 Florida Museums, Jacksonville, Florida
 1996 Gallerie R. Teger, Paris, France
 1995 Anne Reed Gallery, Ketchum, Idaho
 1994 Born on the Bayou: Celebrating Arts of Louisiana, CBís 313 Gallery, New  York, New York
 Horwitch-LewAllen Gallery, Santa Fe, New Mexico
 1993 The Bayou Biennial, BCís 313 Gallery, New York, New York
 1992 Tory Folliard Gallery, Milwaukie, Wisconsin
 American House Gallery, Piermont, New York
 Anne Reed Gallery, Ketchum, Idaho
 1991 Tory Folliard Gallery, Milwaukie, Wisconsin
 Born on the Bayou: Celebrating Arts of Louisiana, CBís 313 Gallery, New York, New York
 Anne Reed Gallery, Ketchum, Idaho
 Southwest Louisiana Artists, Baton Rouge Gallery, Baton Rouge, Louisiana
 Gallery Selection 1991, LewAllen Gallery, Santa Fe, New Mexico
 1990 Art in the Garden VIII, American Crafts Gallery, Cleveland, Ohio
 Interstate 49, Alexandria Museum of Art, Alexandria, Louisiana
 Galerie R. Teger, Paris, France
 1989 Bogus Beasts II, International Gallery, San Diego, California
 Fresh From Down the Road, Contemporary Arts Center, New Orleans, Louisiana
 1988 Multiple Sights, University Art Museum, Lafayette, Louisiana
 Academy Gallery, New Orleans Academy of Fine Arts, New Orleans, Louisiana
 Unrealism, Fayerweather Gallery, University of Virginia, Charlottesville, Virginia
 1987 Return to Eden: John Geldersma and David Butler, Todd Capp Gallery, New York, New York
 Animals, Todd Capp Gallery, New York, New York
 Gris-Gris, Artistís Alliance, Lafayette, New York
 Museum Show, Peidmont Museum, Winston-Salem, North Carolina
 1986 Visual Arts: The Southeast 1986, One Securities Center, Georgia State University, Georgia
 1985 Louisiana Now, Contemporary Arts Center, New Orleans, Louisiana
 1984 The Third Coast Exhibition, Art League of Houston Gallery, Houston, Texas
 1983 A Collection-A Collector:  The Norman Fischer Collection, Jacksonville Art Museum, Jacksonville, Florida
 1982 Sculpture Biennial, Contemporary Arts Center, New Orleans, Louisiana
 1981 Shreveport Art Guild, Meadows Museum of Art, Shreveport, Louisiana
 1980 First Louisiana Biennial Sculpture Invitational, Contemporary Arts Center, New Orleans, Louisiana
 1979 U.S.L. 1960–1979, Contemporary Arts Center, New Orleans, Louisiana
 1977 Fetishes, 112 Greene Street, New York, New York
 Artists Biennial, New Orleans Museum of Art, New Orleans, Louisiana
 Louisiana Environments, Contemporary Arts Center, New Orleans, Louisiana
 Vision, Process, Environment, Lafayette Natural History Museum, Lafayette, Louisiana
 Ninth Annual Invitational, Oklahoma Art Center, Oklahoma City, Oklahoma
 1976 Louisiana Bien Amis, Louisiana Bicentennial Exhibition, Paris, France
 Masur Museum of Art, Monroe, Louisiana
 Ninth National/International Sculpture Conference, Lakefront, Louisiana
 1975 Artistís Biennial, New Orleans Art Museum, Louisiana, Louisiana
 1974 Curved Air, Union Gallery, The University of Southwestern Louisiana, Louisiana
 1973 Louisiana Craft Council Exhibition, New Orleans, Louisiana
 Baton Rouge Gallery, Baton Rouge, Louisiana
 Louisiana American Revolution, Bicentennial Art Exhibitions, Baton Rouge, Louisiana
 1966 Avant Garde Annual Exhibition, Central Park, New York, New York
 1965 Twenty-Third Annual Southeastern Competition, Atlanta, Georgia
 1964 Louisiana State Annual Competition, Baton Rouge, Louisiana
 1963 Annual Competition Sponsored by the American Association of University Women, Dallas, Texas

References 

American woodcarvers
Living people
1942 births